Gosuke John Katoh (Katō Gōsuke, born October 8, 1994) is an American professional baseball infielder for the Hokkaido Nippon-Ham Fighters of Nippon Professional Baseball. He made his Major League Baseball debut in 2022 with the Toronto Blue Jays.

Career

New York Yankees
The New York Yankees selected Katoh in the second round of the 2013 Major League Baseball draft out of Rancho Bernardo High School. He made his professional debut for the Yankees' rookie-league affiliate, appearing in 50 games and batting .310. In 2014, Katoh played for the Single-A Charleston RiverDogs, hitting .222/.345/.326 in 121 games. The following year, Katoh split the season between Charleston and the rookie league Pulaski Yankees, batting a combined .239/.367/.334 with 6 home runs and 31 RBI. For the 2016 season, Katoh returned to Charleston and batted .229/.320/.335 with 1 home run in 65 games. In 2017, Katoh played for the High-A Tampa Yankees, slashing .293/.376/.440 in 84 contests. In 2018, Katoh played in 118 games for the Double-A Trenton Thunder, posting a slash of .229/.327/.335 with 5 home runs and 35 RBI. Katoh split the 2019 season between Trenton and the Triple-A Scranton/Wilkes-Barre RailRiders, hitting .267/.362/.401 with 11 home runs and 46 RBI in 113 games between the two teams. He elected free agency for the first time in his career following the 2019 season on November 4, 2019.

Miami Marlins
On December 18, 2019, Katoh signed a minor league contract with the Miami Marlins organization. Katoh did not play in a game in 2020 due to the cancellation of the minor league season because of the COVID-19 pandemic. He elected free agency following the season on November 2, 2020.

San Diego Padres
On November 16, 2020, Katoh signed a minor league deal with the San Diego Padres organization. In 2021, Katoh played in 114 games for the Triple-A El Paso Chihuahuas, slashing .306/.388/.474 with 8 home runs and 42 RBI. He elected free agency following the season on November 7, 2021.

Toronto Blue Jays
On December 16, 2021, Katoh signed a minor league contract with the Toronto Blue Jays. On April 4, 2022, it was announced that Katoh had made the Opening Day roster. He made his MLB debut on April 9, pinch running for Alejandro Kirk. Katoh was optioned to the Triple-A Buffalo Bisons on April 10, but was recalled on April 14 after Teoscar Hernández was placed on the 10-day injured list. On April 21, he made his first MLB start, drawing a walk and scoring a run on a Bo Bichette RBI. On April 27, he got his first Major League base hit, a double, off of Boston Red Sox pitcher Michael Wacha. On May 1, as MLB active rosters decreased from 28 to 26, he was sent down to the Bisons again, and on May 4, he was designated for assignment.

New York Mets
On May 7, 2022, Katoh was waived by the Blue Jays but later claimed by the New York Mets. The Mets subsequently optioned him to their Triple-A affiliate, the Syracuse Mets. He was designated for assignment on June 16, then was sent outright to Syracuse.

Hokkaido Nippon-Ham Fighters
The Hokkaido Nippon-Ham Fighters of Nippon Professional Baseball (NPB) selected Katoh in the third round of the 2022 NPB draft. He signed with the Fighters for ¥100 million (approximately $677,000).

References

External links

 
 

1994 births
Living people
American baseball players of Japanese descent
Baseball players from California
Buffalo Bisons (minor league) players
Charleston RiverDogs players
El Paso Chihuahuas players
Gulf Coast Yankees players
Major League Baseball infielders
People from Mountain View, California
Pulaski Yankees players
Scranton/Wilkes-Barre RailRiders players
Tampa Yankees players
Toronto Blue Jays players
Trenton Thunder players
American expatriate baseball players in Canada
Syracuse Mets players
Rancho Bernardo High School alumni
Hokkaido Nippon-Ham Fighters players